Jean-Pierre Vanek (born 19 January 1969) is a Luxembourgian footballer. He retired from playing in 2002.

International career
He is a member of the Luxembourg national football team from 1994 to 2002.

External links

1969 births
Living people
Luxembourgian footballers
Luxembourg international footballers
Association football defenders